Government Colleges Hostel (GCH) is a place of residence for students in Mumbai. It accommodates bonafide male students of six government colleges namely Sydenham College, The Government Law College, The Institute of Science, The Sydenham Institute of Management Studies, Research and Entrepreneurship Education, Elphinstone College, and State Institute for Administrative Career.

This hostel is located in Church gate, South of Bombay, and the Hostel is well sought after.

History
The Government Colleges Hostel was established in 1964 when the new building at 46-47, 'C' Road Church gate was constructed. Earlier Sydenham college students Used to be housed at Manek House Near Kemp's Corner, the students of the Institute Of Science and those of Government Law College used to stay at the Telang Memorial Hostel, 'C' Road, Churchgate. In order to accommodate students from Government Colleges at one place near Churchgate, the Government of Maharashtra conceived of constructing the present structure.

Accommodation
There are 287 single and 10 double seated rooms all in all to accommodate 307 students. These are distributed among constituent Colleges and Institutes as under:

Admission

Criteria
Candidate has to be a bona fide student of any of the above Colleges/Institutes.
(With an exception to Freedom Fighters Ward category)
 Candidate has to be a permanent resident outside Mumbai.
 Admission is merit- and need-based.

Process
Interviews for hostel freshmen admission are held at respective colleges.  Lists of eligible candidates are verified and shortlisted at Himalayan.

Facilities
TV hall
Reading room
Indoor sports facilities and gym
Badminton court
Mess and canteen facilities.

Location
The hostel is located at Churchgate of South Mumbai. It is in close proximity to Churchgate station and is close to the business and banking districts of Nariman point, Fort, BSE and Colaba. The location of the hostel is seen as a great advantage for students of commerce and management.
The hostel is just a few steps away from Marine Drive, the famous  seaside promenade of Mumbai.

See also
International Students Hostel
Telang Memorial Hostel
Churchgate

Halls of residence in India
University of Mumbai